The 2020 Southeastern Conference women's basketball tournament was a postseason women's basketball tournament for the Southeastern Conference held at the Bon Secours Wellness Arena in Greenville, South Carolina through March 8, 2020.  The South Carolina Gamecocks won the tournament.

Seeds

Schedule

Bracket 

* denotes overtime period

See also 

 2020 SEC men's basketball tournament

References

2019–20 Southeastern Conference women's basketball season
SEC women's basketball tournament
Basketball competitions in Greenville, South Carolina
SEC Women's Basketball
College basketball tournaments in South Carolina